Greg Lauren  (born ) is an American actor, painter and fashion designer. He is the nephew of fashion designer Ralph Lauren.

Early life
Lauren was born Greg Lauren Dana Smith in New York City, into a family of Belarusian-Jewish descent, and is the nephew of renowned fashion designer Ralph Lauren.

Lauren graduated with a bachelor's degree in art history at Princeton University in 1991.

Career
Lauren portrayed Brett Nelson on The Young and the Restless and has appeared in such films as Friends & Family, The Wedding Planner, and Boogie Nights. A painter, Lauren's nudes command up to $15,000 and have been bought by such celebrities as Renée Zellweger, Demi Moore, Ben Stiller, and Cuba Gooding, Jr.

He has been cover artist for the DC Comics Vertigo title, Hellblazer issues 215-218 were solicited by the publisher. His artwork is sold at Bespoke Collection.

In 2011, he launched his fashion brand named after himself with a ready-to-wear collection for men and women.

Personal life
On November 1, 2003, he wed Saved By The Bell actress Elizabeth Berkley in Cabo San Lucas, Mexico. They married in a Jewish ceremony. They have a son together, born in July 2012.

Filmography

Melrose Place (1994, TV Series) .... Cute Guy
A Friend of Dorothy (1994, Short) .... Matt
Silk Stalkings (1994-1995, TV Series) .... Jeffrey Ventnor / Phil Woodruff
Indictment: The McMartin Trial (1995, TV Movie) .... Reporter #7
Batman Forever (1995) .... Aide
Sawbones (1995, TV Movie) .... Richard Klein
Loungers (1995) .... Conrad
Twelve (1996, Short) .... Uncle Mick
The Little Death .... Neighbor
A Time to Kill (1996) .... Taylor
Batman & Robin (1997) .... Motorcycle Gang Member #2
Boogie Nights (1997) .... Young Stud
Working (1997, TV Series) .... Greg
The Practice (1997, TV Series) .... Myra's Husband
Between Brothers (1997, TV Series) .... Billings
Diagnosis: Murder (1998, TV Series) .... Freddie
The Young and the Restless (1998-1999, TV Series) .... Brett Nelson / Brett
The Learning Curve (1999) .... Todd
The Disciples (1999, TV Movie) .... Mick Partridge
What Angels Fear (1999) .... Kevin Bochelli
The Prophet's Game (2000) .... Detective James
The Wedding Planner (2001) .... Keith
The Elevator (2001, TV Movie) .... Charles
V.I.P. (2001, TV Series) .... Kyle Stamper
Friends & Family (2001) .... Stephen Torcelli
Pasadena (2001, TV Series) .... Steve
Time of Fear (2002) .... Det. Steve Benton
Hitters (2002)
Women in Trouble (2009) .... Fireman

References

External links
Greg Lauren's home page - with some samples of his paintings.

1970 births
20th-century American painters
American male painters
21st-century American painters
21st-century American male artists
American male film actors
American male soap opera actors
American male television actors
Jewish American male actors
American people of Belarusian-Jewish descent
Living people
Male actors from New York City
Princeton University alumni
21st-century American male actors
20th-century American male actors
21st-century American Jews
20th-century American male artists